KHUM is a commercial Freeform broadcast radio station licensed to Cutten, California, serving Eureka and Humboldt County in California.  KHUM is owned and operated by Lost Coast Communications, Inc.

KHUM simulcasts on translator K282AD, broadcasting at 104.3 FM. The translator and the station's studios are located in Ferndale, California.

History and operations
Founded by Jacqueline Debets and Cliff Berkowitz, KHUM signed on January 7, 1996.  Patrick Cleary (along with his family) is KHUM's majority owner.

Programming
Midge is KHUM's Program Director and Music Director. Past air staff include Larry Trask, Cliff Berkowitz, Bayley Brown, Lyndsey Battle, Cam Trujillo, Lila Nelson, Emily McLongstreet, Michael Moore, Pam Long, Matt Brunner, Gary Franklin, Jess McGuinty, Ryan Lee and Mike Dronkers.  Air staff also included "Digital" Dan Lawrence, who lost part of his throat to cancer and used a computer voice simulator during his two radio programs.

The current weekday lineup consists of Midge "in the morning" (6am-12pm, Pacific), Greta in the afternoon (12pm-6pm, Pacific) and Amy Berkowitz in the evening.  Gus Mozart, DJ Goldylocks, Chas Lewis, and Darren Weiss are also heard on KHUM.

Each year, KHUM undertakes a local Stop The Violence campaign, which includes three weeks of drive-time interviews with experts in and survivors of domestic abuse, street violence, and systemic violence.  KHUM maintains a Stop The Violence Fund at a local foundation, and annual donations are made to local charities.

KHUM broadcasts live coverage of the annual world championship Kinetic Sculpture Race, which was founded in Ferndale and runs down Main Street past their studio.

Awards
KHUM has won numerous national awards for production and programming, including an Edward R. Murrow Award from the Radio-Television News Director Association for its broadcast series, Picking Up: Meth on the North Coast, an NAB Crystal Radio Award for public service on June 12, 2006, as well as several awards for commercial writing and production.  In 2006, KHUM was awarded the "Friend in Need Award" by the National Association of Broadcasters for keeping the "community safe and informed" after a large storm left three quarters of Humboldt County without power.

Translator
In addition to the main station, KHUM is relayed by an FM translator to widen its broadcast area.

References

External links
 K-HUM Online
 

1996 establishments in California
Freeform radio stations
Radio stations established in 1996
HUM
Mass media in Humboldt County, California